2021 Metfone C-League  is the 37th season of the C-League. Contested by 13 clubs, it operates on a system of promotion and relegation with Cambodian Second League. Boeung Ket are the defending champions, while Prey Veng makes its debut as the promoted team from the 2020 Cambodian Second League.

2021 season clubs

Teams

Personnel and kits

Foreign players

The number of foreign players is restricted to five per team. A team can use four foreign players on the field in each game, including at least one player from the AFC region.

Players name in bold indicates the player is registered during the mid-season transfer window.

*Note: Electricite du Cambodge do not use foreign players.

League table

Results

Season statistics

Top scorers
As of 20 November 2021.

Hat-tricks
As of 18 November 2021.

Note:
4 player scored 4 goals

Clean sheets
As of 20 November 2021.

Awards

See also
2021 Cambodian Second League
2021 Hun Sen Cup

References

Cambodia
C-League seasons
1